John Glen (July 26, 1744 – May 1799) was an American politician who served as the first Chief Justice of Georgia (1776–1778) and Mayor of Savannah (1797–1798).

Biography
Glen was born on May 4, 1758 in Charleston, South Carolina, the son of Ann (née Alricks) and William Glen. In 1767, after graduating in law, he moved to Savannah, Georgia where he started his own legal practice. In 1769, he was elected to the lower Assembly in the Georgia colonial legislature. In 1776, he was elected as Georgia's first Chief Justice; he served until 1778. He was captured during the Revolutionary War and was detained as a prisoner of war in Charleston.  He returned to Savannah in 1785. He served as mayor of Savannah from 1797 to 1798. He died in May 1799.

References

1744 births
1799 deaths
Mayors of Savannah, Georgia
Politicians from Savannah, Georgia